Foijan Prawet, who boxes as Wethya Sakmuangklang, (born 6 July 1976 in Buriram Province, Thailand) is a Thai professional boxer who fights at super bantamweight.

He is the current OPBF super bantamweight champion.

He also got knocked out by Manny Pacquiao in the 6th round.

References

External links
 

1976 births
Living people
Wethya Sakmuangklang
Wethya Sakmuangklang
Super-bantamweight boxers